Astreopora gracilis is a species of hard coral found in shallow water in the tropical Indian and Pacific Oceans. It is an uncommon species with a wide range and the International Union for Conservation of Nature has assessed its conservation status as being of "least concern".

References

Acroporidae
Cnidarians of the Pacific Ocean
Cnidarians of the Indian Ocean
Fauna of the Red Sea
Marine fauna of Oceania
Corals described in 1896